Shandong Gold Group is a state-owned Chinese gold mining company under the provincial government of Shandong. The company is the second-largest producer of gold in China by output and its publicly-listed subsidiary ranked #1,898 in the Forbes Global 2000.

Corporate affairs
Shandong Gold Group is the parent company of Shandong Gold Mining, which is listed on the Shanghai Stock Exchange. Following a pact announced in September 2018 with Barrick Gold, the world's largest gold miner by output, both companies agreed to strengthen ties with each other by cross-investing up to $300 million in each other's shares, with Barrick Gold buy shares in Shandong Gold via the Shanghai Stock Exchange. The cross-investment agreement followed the purchase of a 50% interest by Shandong Gold in Barrick Gold's Veladero mine in Argentina in April 2017.

As a Shandong provincial state-owned enterprise, the company is directly supervised by the Stated-owned Assets Supervision and Administration Commission of the Shandong Provincial Government.

The company is a member of the World Gold Council, a trade body that promotes the gold industry and promulgates social and environmental standards for gold mining.

Operations

Domestic gold mining
The company primary gold mining and exploration activity are domestic. The gold production from its 12 domestic mines in Shandong, Inner Mongolia, Gansu, and Fujian account for 6.6% of national output. A gigantic discovery was announced in September 2018 when the company found a site with at least 382 tonnes of gold worth an estimated $22 billion in the Laizhou-Zhaoyuan area of the Shandong Peninsula.

International gold mining
In April 2017 Shandong Gold purchased a 50% interest in Barrick Gold's Veladero mine in Argentina for US$960 million and also formed a partnership to explore joint-development of the Pascua-Lama deposit. In May 2020, Shandong Gold entered into an agreement to purchase a gold mining project in Nunavut. In October 2020, the Canadian government commenced a national security review of Shandong Gold's proposed purchase agreement in Nunavut. The Canadian government rejected Shandong Gold's bid for national security reasons in December 2020.

In 2021, Shandong Gold Group announced to have acquired Ghana-focused gold mine developer Cardinal Resources Ltd., after winning a bidding war with Russian gold miner Nordgold SE.

Non-gold businesses
The company has several non-gold related businesses including nonferrous metal, tourism and real estate. It has financial services subsidiaries in both China and Hong Kong (SD Gold Financial Holdings Group and SDG Asset Management (HK) Limited).

References

External links
 

Gold mining companies of China
Companies based in Jinan
Government-owned companies of China
1975 establishments in China
Companies established in 1975